Phenatoma decessor is an extinct species of sea snail, a marine gastropod mollusk in the family Borsoniidae.

Description
The length of the shell is 17 mm, its width 6 mm. Marwick considered this species a direct ancestor of Phenatoma rosea to which it closely resembles in shape and ornamentation.

Distribution
This extinct marine species was endemic to New Zealand and fossils were found in fossiliferous beds of calcareous tuffs at Whenuaturu Peninsula.

References

 J. "The Tertiary Mollusca of the Chatham Islands including a generic revision of the New Zealand Pectinidae." Transactions of the New Zealand institute. Vol. 58. No. 4. 1928
 Maxwell, P.A. (2009). Cenozoic Mollusca. pp 232–254 in Gordon, D.P. (ed.) New Zealand inventory of biodiversity. Volume one. Kingdom Animalia: Radiata, Lophotrochozoa, Deuterostomia. Canterbury University Press, Christchurch.

decessor
Gastropods of New Zealand